The Carte de l'Égypte, from the Description de l'Égypte, was the first triangulation-based map of Egypt, Syria and Palestine. The mapmaking expedition was led by Pierre Jacotin. It was used as the basis for many most maps of the region for much of the nineteenth century.

It was originally prepared during the 1799-1800 French campaign in Egypt and Syria. Despite the maps being dated 1818 and 1826, they were not published until 1828–30.

The maps can be seen in detail at Wikimedia Commons: Carte topographique de l’Égypte.

Editions and related documents
 First edition: 
 Second edition: 
 Memoir: Mémoire sur la construction de la carte de l'Egypte par M. Jacotin
 Supplementary tables: Jacotin, M.: Tableau de la superficie de l'Égypte

Maps of Palestine - Files 43-47

See also
Cartography of Palestine

Bibliography

References

Maps of Palestine (region)
Maps of Egypt
19th-century maps and globes